An annoyance factor (or nuisance or irritation factor), in advertising and brand management, is a variable used to measure consumers' perception level of annoyance in an ad, then analyzed to help evaluate the ad's effectiveness. The variable can be observed or inferred and is a type that might be used in factor analyses. An annoyance effect (or nuisance or irritation effect) is a reference to the impact or result of an annoying stimulus, which can be a strategic aspect of an advertisement intended to help a message stick in the minds of consumers. References to annoyance effects have been referred to as annoyance dynamics. While the words "factor" and "effect," as used in the behavioral sciences, have different meanings, in casual vernacular, they have been used interchangeably as synonymous. A more general or umbrella term would simply be advertising annoyance.

History 

Comment on advertising in 1850 associated some practices (disparagingly) with begging.

Measuring annoyance factors 
The discipline of identifying and measuring annoyance in quantitative research became prevalent around 1968, an outgrowth of the quantitative revolution in social sciences that began in the 1950s. Before that, use and assessment – theoretical and applied (pre-testing, case studies, etc.) – was mostly  qualitative (even simply intuitive or  anecdotal); although the literature, since 1968, has been a mix of  qualitative and  quantitative. Identifying, testing, and evaluating annoyance factors is both cross-disciplinary and interdisciplinary. Activity includes psychology, sociology, anthropology, semiotics, economics, management science, and (since the advent of the information revolution about 1992) many fields related to information technology and engineering.

Generally, annoyance from an ad can be identified in three areas:

 content
 execution
 placement

Annoyance in ad production and placement 
Setting aside advances in technology, the interdisciplinary fields involved in production phases of broadcast media (including digital online) that deal with advertising annoyance – including film (videography), music, art, design, and copy – have remained relatively similar since the dawn of broadcasting.

Applications 
An annoyance stimulus can be (a) a desired marketing strategy or (b) an unavoidable, albeit inherent mix of attributes of a marketing message to weigh and balance or minimize. Traditional annoyance stimuli might feature repetitive phrases or repetitive ads or an annoying communicator. Annoyance stimuli – whether nuanced, subtle, or overt – might involve creating an unpleasant sound, such as a bad jingle – one that consumers can't get out of their heads. In the Northeastern United States, specifically the New York and Philadelphia metropolitan areas, the Mister Softee jingle, officially titled "Jingle and Chimes," is both loved and hated. It sticks in people's heads. The New York Times characterized it as "exquisitely Pavlovian, triggering salivation or shrieking — sometimes both at once." In the same article, the New York Times asserted that "it is the textbook embodiment of an earworm: once heard, never forgotten."

Generally, broadcast and streaming advertising is annoying. Exceptions might include product placement – which avoids interruptions. Advertisers commonly try to appeal to positive emotions – and, with a careful mix of various gradations of annoyance(s), appealing to those emotions can be achieved. Nonetheless, the goal is to etch a message in the minds of consumers without turning them off. Capital outlay for the use of it can be relatively expensive for major consumer product companies and the research behind it, sophisticated.

Annoyance stimuli – visual or auditory or perceptual – can be in any combination of loudness, repetition, length  On television, radio, print media, packaging, product displays, billboards, mail, telemarketing (especially robocalls), the internet – including email, and mobile devices, e.g.:

 banners
 pop-ups
 floating ads
 interstitials
 prevideo (skip and no-skip)
 autoplay video
 skyscrapers
 large rectangles
 sponsored social media content
 digital on-screen graphic

 also direct-to-consumer ads (especially pharmaceuticals), call to action marketing, and false ads.

The annoyance stimuli of some ad campaigns might be so subtle that, initially, it is unnoticeable, but over time, highly noticeable. For instance, Folgers Coffee, which was acquired by Procter & Gamble in 1963, ran high frequency ads on TV and in print from 1965 to 1986 featuring "Mrs. Olson," portrayed by actress Virginia Christine (1920–1996). Some consumers initially perceived her messages as pleasant, but over time, annoying – as some research found. Yet, the annoyance technique was a successful brand-strengthening strategy. Under P&G, Folgers became the number one coffee brand in America. The target market of P&G's high-frequency campaign became multipronged. Consumers who infrequently watched TV were likely to see the message at least once (an effective reach strategy) – while those who binge-watched, even if annoyed, might still choose Folgers, if for no other reason, because the name is etched in their minds (an effective weight strategy). Although interruptions are annoying – whether high-frequency or long run-slots – the disruptions caused by the interruptions are most often intentional efforts to redirect the attention of viewers with the aim of sharpening their focus. Primetime TV (as of 2019) has breaks that run back-to-back 30-second ads for as long as 6-minute intervals.

Annoyance factor thresholds 
When advertisers intentionally use annoyance stimuli, they strive to know annoyance thresholds (compare to anxiety thresholds) and carefully monitor them. Crossing thresholds can adversely affect brands and consumer behavior. For example, TV channel surfing – especially in eras following the emergence of remote controls, is a concern for advertisers and program producers. To mitigate viewer drift from surfing, programmers strategically place ads just moments in front of the apex of a plot device or rising action or climax or conclusion or in the midst of suspense – leaving viewers hanging. It doesn't significantly deter channel surfing, but it does lure surfers back. Strategic timing, however, is not commonly deployed in internet broadcasts. For example, a YouTube re-broadcast of CNN news might simply insert ad interruptions in random spots. Another way that major TV networks attempt to mitigate viewer drift from surfing is to synchronize ad-breaks with those of other networks so that their respective ads run at the same time; when a viewer switches to another channel during a commercial break, they will be switching to another advertisement. In some situations, the same sponsor will air an ad simultaneously on one or more of the other channels.

Advertising in premium venues or platforms (where consumers have already paid) – movie theaters, cable TV, satellite radio – are routine and generally accepted. Any associated annoyance factors, even perceptions of bait-and-switch, are dismissed by consumers as negative albeit long-standing unavoidable economic realities of the respective industries.

Email spam, universally accepted as an annoyance factor threshold breach, can be effective from a statistical perspective. However, since 1998, when unsolicited political bulk email first became widespread, legal analyst Seth Grossman pointed out (in 2004) that state and federal governments increasingly have regulated unsolicited commercial email, but political spam had almost uniformly been exempted. Grossman averred that politicians apparently did not feel a need to regulate political spam, their argument being that they would never use spam, due to the annoyance factor.

Challenges of minimizing avoidance of longer ads 
For DVR-TiVo users, studies have shown that short ads, 5 seconds, are more effective than 30-second (and longer) ads – due to the annoyance factor of longer ads. The problem, however, is whether programmers can sell 5-second ads instead of 30-second (and longer) ads, with similar pricing – especially considering the challenge of consistently producing effective 5-second ads.

Annoyance factors that influence ad avoidance 
 Perceived intrusiveness
 Perceived informativeness
 Ad utilities
 High-pressure advertising (hard sell, as contrasted by soft sell)
 Questionable and polarized advertising, including pharmaceuticals (patent medicine, including off-label use), firearms, political campaigns, tobacco

Annoying albeit effective ads 
Some ads are deliberately annoying. Some are cute or funny, but, for some, wear thin over time. "Memorable, but not always effective" 

North America 

 Mascots
 The Aflac Duck
 The Band, FreeCreditScore.com
 Betty White, Snickers
 Dusty the Dusthole, Clark County, Nevada
 Energizer Bunny
 Erin Esurance
 Flo, Progressive
 Go-Gurt independent child, Yoplait
 The King, Burger King
 Foghorn Leghorn, as used by GEICO
 GEICO gecko
 GEICO Cavemen
 HeadOn
 Kia Soul Hamsters
 Mayhem, Allstate
 
 Mr. Opportunity, Honda
 Mr. Six, Six Flags
 
 Peggy, Discover Card
 Poppin' Fresh, Pillsbury

 Jingles
 "Jingles and Chimes," Mister Softee
 (audio via YouTube)

 Phrases

Exhibit of an annoyance factor analysis table 
Factor analysis of perceptual items and attitude measures in online advertising:

Academicians Kelli S. Burns, PhD, and Richard J. Lutz, PhD, surveyed online users in 2002. In doing so, they chose six online ad formats: (i) banners, (ii) pop-ups, (iii) floating ads, (iv) skyscrapers, (v) large rectangles, and (vi) interstitials.

To develop perceptual factors, ratings of the 15 perceptual items for all six on-line ad formats were run through principal components analysis with varimax rotation. The authors inferred – from a scree plot – a possible three-factor solution. The first three factors accounted for over 68% of the total variance. The remaining 12 reflected no more than 5% of the variance, each. The first of the seven tables in their paper, Table 1 (below), shows the loadings of the factors generated through principal component extraction and varimax rotation.

Performing arts analogy 
Using annoyances as disruptive devices in advertising to help messages sink-in can be analogous to jarring devices used in performing arts. For example, in the Alvin Ailey American Dance Theater December 6, 2019, premier of Greenwood at City Center in New York, Donald Byrd (born 1949), the choreographer, described his work as "theater of disruption"  "it disrupts our thinking about things, especially, in particular, things around race." The dance performance addresses a 1921 racist mob attack in Tulsa's then segregated Greenwood District, which, at the time, was one of the country's most affluent African American communities, known as "America's Black Wall Street."

See also 
The following subjects may address certain aspects or fall within the scope of annoyance dynamics.

 General
 Ad tracking
 Advertising
 Advertising adstock
 Advertising campaign
 Advertising media selection
 Advertorial
 Ambient media
 Audience measurement
 Attack marketing
 Brand image
 Brand linkage
 Busking
 Campaign advertising
 Cause marketing
 Celebrity branding
 Clutter
 Comparative advertising
 Conquesting
 Content marketing
 Customer engagement
 Database marketing
 Demographic targeting
 Direct marketing
 Effective frequency
 Engagement marketing
 Event marketing
 Frequency capping
 Global advertising
 Guerrilla marketing
 Hidden message
 In-flight advertising
 Integrated marketing communications
 Interruption science
 Marketing communications
 Marketing buzz
 Mind share
 Mobile billboard
 Multichannel marketing
 Music in advertising
 Native advertising
 Out-of-home advertising (OOH)
 People meter
 Perceptual mapping
 Positioning
 Promo
 Promotional mix
 Puffery
 Targeted advertising
 Top-of-mind awareness

 Broadcast
 Bumper
 
 
 Commercial skipping
 Gross rating point
 Radio advertisement
 Skinny bundle
 Television advertisement

 TV-online hybrid
 Non-linear media
 Over-the-top media services (OTT)
 Smart TV
 Video on demand (VOD)
 Virtual advertising

 Illicit, malicious, or misleading
 Browser hijacking
 DNS hijacking
 False advertising
 ISP redirect page
 Malvertising
 Trick banner

 Internet and mobile
 Ad exchange
 Ad blocking
 Admail
 Banner blindness
 Behavioral retargeting
 Clickbait (or Chumbox)
 Contextual advertising
 Conversion marketing
 Cost per action
 Cost-per-click
 Cost per lead
 Data Management Platform
 Display advertising
 Dynamic ad insertion
 Freemium
 Geotargeting
 Impression
 Insertion order
 iPod advertising
 Mobile marketing
 Mobile phone content advertising
 Online advertising
 Opt-in email
 Pacing
 PPM (Pay per 1000 impressions)
 Run of network
 Search engine marketing
 Share of voice
 Surround sessions
 Sticky content
 UX
 Video advertising
 Viewable Impression
 Viral marketing
 Web analytics

 Psychology
 Instances of subliminal messages
 Racial stereotyping in advertising
 Sensory branding
 Sex in advertising
 Shock advertising
 Subliminal stimuli

 Research and criticism
 Advertising research
 Criticism of advertising
 Copy testing
 Media context studies

 Advertising research organizations and firms
 Advertising Checking Bureau
 Advertising Research Foundation
 Ameritest
 Audience Measurement and Analytics Ltd. (aMap)
 Communicus
 Gallup & Robinson
 Nielsen Audio
 Nielsen Broadcast Data Systems
 Nielsen Corporation
 Nielsen Holdings
 Nielsen Media Research
 Numeris

 Categories
 :Category:Films about advertising

 In other languages on Wikipedia

Notes and references

Notes

References 
{{Reflist|30em|refs=

<ref name="NYTs 1981 Aug 26">

Academic and/or peer reviewed references 

Business terms
Consumer behaviour
Consumer theory
Types of marketing
Advertising techniques
Marketing techniques
Promotion and marketing communications
Advertising
Television advertising
Online advertising
Digital marketing
Film and video terminology
Television terminology
Internet terminology
Audience measurement
Market research